Natalie Live is a 1978 live album by American singer Natalie Cole. Released on June 13, 1978, this double-length live album was recorded at two different locations: In August 1977 at the Universal Amphitheatre in Los Angeles, California, and in March 1978 at the Latin Casino in Cherry Hill, New Jersey.

Track listing

Personnel
 Natalie Cole – lead vocals
 Linda Williams, Michael Wycoff – keyboards at Universal Amphitheater 
 Charles Bynum - guitar at Latin Casino 
 Andrew Kastner – guitar at Universal Amphitheater 
 Bobby Eaton – bass at Universal Amphitheater 
 Teddy Sparks - drums at Universal Amphitheater 
 Wayne Habersham - percussion at Universal Amphitheater  
 Louis Palomo –  percussion at Latin Casino
 Anita Anderson, Michael Wycoff, Sissy Peoples, Wayne Habersham – backing vocals
 Gene Barge, Richard Evans, Don Hannah –  arrangements
 Jules Chaikin - orchestral contractor at Universal Amphitheater 
 Louis Krause – orchestral contractor at Latin Casino
 Linda Williams – orchestral conductor

Production
 Producers – Charles Jackson, Gene Barge and Marvin Yancy.
 Executive Producer – Larkin Arnold
 Engineers – Barney Perkins and Ray Thompson
 Mixed by Barney Perkins and Zollie Johnson at ABC Studios (Los Angeles, CA).
 Editing – Gene Barge, Charles Jackson, Zollie Johnson, Barney Perkins and Marvin Yancy.
 Mastered by Wally Traugott at Capitol Studios (Hollywood, CA).
 Design – Kathy Morphesis
 Design and Artwork – Roger Williams
 Liner Notes – David Nathan
 Management – Kevin Hunter

Charts

Singles

Certifications

References

External links
 Natalie Live! at Discogs

1978 live albums
Natalie Cole albums
Capitol Records live albums